

Top-grossing films
The top-grossing films at the Indian Box Office in 1990:

1990

References

External links
 Bollywood films of 1990 at the Internet Movie Database

1990
Lists of 1990 films by country or language
 Boll
1990 in Indian cinema